Shilavo Airport is an airport in Shilavo, Ethiopia . It has a single unpaved runway.

References
Shilavo Airport (HIL)

Airports in Ethiopia
Somali Region